Good Morning World is a 2007 satirical television show posing as a fictional morning show called "Good Morning World". It starred (and was also created by) Peter Oldring and Pat Kelly, as hosts Andy Peppers and Allister Coulter.

The show aired on Fridays at 8:30 pm ET/PT on The Comedy Network. Each TV episode served as a recap of the previous week of webisodes, available to view at the comedy network.

In an interview with newteevee.com, co-creator and star Peter Oldring stated that the show was entirely improvised.

References

External links
'Good Morning World' Official Website
'Good Morning World' Podcasts
'Good Morning World' Comedy Network page
'Good Morning World' Webisodes Archive

2007 Canadian television series debuts
2000s Canadian satirical television series
CTV Comedy Channel original programming